Du'an Yao Autonomous County (Zhuang:) is an autonomous county under the administration of Hechi City, in the northwest of Guangxi, China.

Administrative divisions 
There are 2 towns and 17 townships in the county:

Towns:
Anyang (安阳镇), Gaoling (高岭镇), Daxing (大兴镇)

Townships:
Chengjiang Township (澄江乡), Disu Township (地苏乡), Dongmiao Township (东庙乡), Xia'ao Township (下坳乡), Longfu Township (隆福乡), Bao'an Township (保安乡), Banling Township (板岭乡), Yong'an Township (永安乡), Sanzhiyang Township (三只羊乡), Longwan Township (龙湾乡), Jingsheng Township (菁盛乡), Lalie Township (拉烈乡), Baiwang Township (百旺乡), Jiagui Township (加贵乡), Laren Township (拉仁乡), Jiudu Township (九渡乡)

Transportation 
China National Highway 210

Climate

References

External links 
Official website of Du'an Government

 
County-level divisions of Guangxi
Administrative divisions of Hechi
Yao autonomous counties